is a Japanese manga series written and illustrated by J-ta Yamada. The manga was serialized in Mag Garden's magazine Comic Blade Masamune between March 3, 2005 and June 15, 2007; five bound volumes were released in Japan.  The manga was adapted into an anime series produced by J.C.Staff, which aired in Japan between October and December 2006. The story is about a young girl who grows older into an adult, and an adult woman who becomes younger, turning into a child. The anime is licensed by Sentai Filmworks, and a complete series boxset was distributed by Section23 Films on DVD on April 13, 2010.

Plot
Asatte no Hōkō follows the lives of Karada Iokawa, a young girl who is set to join junior high school after summer is over, and Shōko Nogami, a young woman who has just returned from studying abroad, who also happens to be the former girlfriend of Karada's older brother. The day Shōko returns, she is dragged by Karada to the beach with her brother and a couple of their friends since she used to know Karada's brother Hiro several years before.

After becoming irritated with Hiro for leaving her alone in the United States, she purposefully tells Karada that her ribbons are childish. This upsets her greatly because she doesn't like to be treated as a child. Later that same day, Karada is found by Shōko praying at a shrine, wishing to become older. Amazingly, Karada's wish becomes true and she instantly transforms into a young woman. Incidentally, Shōko then has her adulthood taken away from her and she reverts to about eleven years old.

Characters

Karada is a cheerful young girl who is about to enter her first year of junior high school. Her adopted parents died when she was two years old, and since then she has lived with her older brother, Hiro. Despite her age, she has learned to cook and do house chores herself. Her wish to not be a burden on her brother, combined with her knowledge (unknown to Hiro) that she is only an adoptive sibling, drives her to wish to become an adult. Her friend and classmate, Tetsumasa, seems to have feelings for her. After hearing Tetsu's confession to her (in her adult form), she also falls in love with Tetsu shortly afterwards.

Shōko is a young woman who has just recently returned from overseas in the United States. She first meets Karada at the shrine that contained a fated wishing stone. She used to be Hiro's girlfriend; she met him while in America and it seems that they were very close. Hiro told her that he would return right after his parents' funeral, but she waited for months and then received a letter saying he would not be coming back. She did not know Hiro had a younger sister. She wished to become a child, without knowing herself that she really wished for it. She starts to get attached to Karada after she knows her properly.

Hiro is a young man who was Shōko's boyfriend when he was studying abroad. They went to the same university in Boston. He had to leave in order to attend to his parents' funeral, and never came back because he had to stay in Japan to take care of his sister, Karada. Several months later, he sent a letter to Shōko saying he would never come back, but without explaining the reason. It is later revealed that he is not really Karada's older brother, but met her for the first time at his parents' funeral. He thought that he would return to America right after the funeral, but after meeting her, he could not leave her alone. He works in a pharmacy.

Often called just "Tetsu," he is Karada's classmate and one of her closest friends. Tetsu is quite tall, and jokes that he is sometimes mistaken for a high school student. It is implied that he loves Karada—when Karada "went missing" after she became older, he ran all over town to find her. He does not like Hiro because he interferes in Tetsu and Karada's moments together.

Tōko is Tetsu's older sister, also a friend of Karada and Hiro. She works at the coffee house Hiro often visits.

Tetsu and Tōko's relative, a spunky, spontaneous young girl. Although she talks smoothly near Tetsu's mother, outside of her hearing she is another person. She is an original character in the anime and thus was never in the manga version.

Media

Manga
The manga series is written and illustrated by J-ta Yamada and was serialized from March 3, 2005 to June 15, 2007 in Mag Garden's monthly Comic Blade Masamune magazine, and spanned five volumes, with the final volume released on September 9, 2007. Compared to the anime adapted from it, the manga includes more personal drama between the leads, and introduces several more characters who are also vying for the Wishing Stone. It also clarifies several points which are left ambiguous in the anime, such as the precise nature of the relationship between Hiro and Karada.

Anime
An anime adaptation was produced by J.C.Staff and directed by Katsushi Sakurabi. The broadcast started in Japan between October 5 and December 21, 2006 on TBS. It made its Animax Asia debut on January 2, 2009 under the title Living for the Day After Tomorrow with an English dub. The series is licensed by Sentai Filmworks, and a complete series box set was distributed by Section23 Films on DVD on April 13, 2010.

Two pieces of theme music were used for the anime; one opening theme and one ending theme. Two image song albums were released sung by the voice actresses from the anime. The first album was released on December 6, 2006 featuring songs by Ayumi Fujimura (who voiced Karada Iokawa); while most of the album is by Ayumi Fujimura, the last song, "Namida Gumo", is sung by Suara. The second image song album followed by January 11, 2007 with songs by Shizuka Itō (who voiced Shōko Nogami); both albums were released by Lantis in Japan.

Episodes

References

External links
 Anime official website 
 

2005 manga
2006 anime television series debuts
2006 Japanese television series endings
Anime series based on manga
Drama anime and manga
Fantasy anime and manga
J.C.Staff
Lantis (company)
IG Port franchises
Mag Garden manga
Sentai Filmworks
Shōnen manga
TBS Television (Japan) original programming